The 2016–17 England Korfball League season is played with 8 teams. Trojans KC are the defending champions. As there will be an extension of the league from 8 to 10 teams for the 2017–18 season, the last placed team will not be automatically relegated, instead they will go into the Promotion play-offs to fight for another 
season in the league.

Teams

A total of 8 teams will be taking part in the league: The best six teams from the 2015–16 season and the number 1 and 2 of the 2015-16 promotion/relegation play-offs.

Regular Season Table

Results

Game-week one

Game-week two

Game-week three

Game-week four

Game-week five

Game-week six

Game-week seven

Game-week eight

Game-week nine

Game-week ten

Game-week eleven

Game-week twelve

Game-week thirteen

Game-week fourteen

Final Stages

Top scorers

Updated to match(es) played on 26 March 2017.

Squads

The players listed are ones that have appeared at least once for the club this season in a league game.

Trojans 

Head Coach: Gary Brooks

Bec 

Head coach: Dave Buckland

Bearsted 

  Head coach: Alexander Sieber

Kingfishers 

 Head coach:  Ross Carr-Taylor

Tornadoes 

  Head coach: Corinne Buckland

Nomads 

Head Coach: Peter Teague

Norwich Knights 

  Head coach: Joe Stirling

KV 

  Head coach: Rob Williams

References 

England Korfball League
England
England
Korfball
Korfball